was a town located in Nitta District, Gunma Prefecture, Japan.

On March 28, 2005, Ojima, along with the towns of Nitta and Yabuzukahon (all from Nitta District), was merged into the expanded city of Ōta.

Dissolved municipalities of Gunma Prefecture
Ōta, Gunma